Cinema City is a brand of multiplex cinemas in eastern and central Europe, run by the Israeli company Cinema City International (CCI). In Europe it has cinemas in Bulgaria, Czech Republic, Hungary, Poland, Romania, and Slovakia. CCI also runs a chain of Israeli multiplexes under the name of Rav-Hen.

On 19 January 2011, as a part of a bigger European deal, Cinema City acquires 8 multiplexes (4 of them in Prague) from Palace Cinemas with 65 screens.

Current multiplex locations 

Active cinemas:
Brno
Olympia - 10 screens, opened October 1999
Velký Špalíček - 1413 seats, 7 screens, opened August 2001
Prague
Slovanský dům - 10 screens, opened 2000
Nový Smíchov - 11 screens + 4DX, opened November 2001
Obchodní centrum Letňany - 12 screens, opened October 2002
Metropole Zličin - 1841 seats, 10 screens, opened December 2002
Palac Flora - 2150 seats, 8 screens + IMAX, opened March 2003
Westfield Chodov - 18 screens - 1 4DX - 3 VIP, opened October 2017
Other
Pilsen Plaza/Plzeň Plaza (Plzeň) - 1720 seats, 10 screens + 4DX, opened 2008
AFI Palace (Pardubice) - 988 seats, 8 screens, opened January 2009
Forum Liberec (Liberec) - 5 screens, opened September 2010
OC Forum (Ústí nad Labem) - opened 2010
Nová Karolína (Ostrava) - 8 screens

Former cinemas:
Novodvorská Plaza (Prague) - 848 seats, 5 screens, opened March 2006 and ceased operation in December 2008 due to low visit rate
Galaxie (Prague) - 1728 seats, 9 screens, opened April 1996 as the first multiplex cinema in the Czech Republic and ceased operation in September 2019.

Current IMAX locations 
Outside Poland CCI runs one IMAX cinema in Prague, alongside Flora multiplex.

Corporate governance 
The board of directors has three members:
 Mooky Greidinger (CEO)
 Amos Weltsch (COO)
 Israel Greidinger (CFO)

See also 
Cinema City Hungary
Cinema City Poland
Rav-Hen

References

External links 
Cinema City Czech website (Czech and English version)

Entertainment companies of the Czech Republic
Cinema chains in the Czech Republic